Excursions is an album by the American jazz saxophonist Eddie Harris released on the Atlantic label, mainly recorded in 1973 but featuring some tracks recorded in 1966 and 1967. The album includes two tracks recorded at the sessions for Mean Greens (Atlantic, 1966) and four tracks recorded at the sessions for The Electrifying Eddie Harris (Atlantic, 1967).

Reception

The Allmusic review says, "Eddie Harris is heard in top form on the diverse program, some of which is funky and some of which is purely straightahead."

Track listing
All compositions by Eddie Harris except as indicated

Disc One:
 "Drunk Man" - 3:19 
 "Renovated Rhythm" - 4:53 
 "Inapplicable Concord" -  4:09 
 "Listen Here Goes Funky" - 8:21 
 "Turbulence" (Harris, Muhal Richard Abrams, Billy James, Ronald Muldrow, Rufus Reid) - 16:35 
 "Of Age" (Harris, Jodie Christian) - 3:05 
Recorded in New York City on March 20, 1967 (track 6) and January 8, 1973 (track 1-5)
Disc Two: 
 "Fragmentary Apparitions" - 10:46 
 "Hey Wado" - 5:53 
 "Aleph the Fool" - 4:31 
 "Recess" - 5:40 
 "I'm Lonely" (Marvin Lagunott) - 4:02 
 "Oleo" (Sonny Rollins) - 10:35
Recorded in New York City on March 8, 1966 (track 4), March 9, 1966 (track 2), March 20, 1967 (tracks 3, 5 & 6) and January 8, 1973 (track 1)

Personnel
Eddie Harris - tenor saxophone, varitone, reed trumpet
Jodie Christian (Disc One, track 6, Disc Two, tracks 3, 5 & 6), Cedar Walton (Disc Two, tracks 2 & 4) - piano
Muhal Richard Abrams (Disc One, tracks 4 & 5), Larry Nash (Disc One, tracks 1-3, Disc Two, track 1) - electric piano 
Ronald Muldrow - electric guitar (Disc One, tracks 1-5)
Ron Carter (Disc Two, tracks 2 & 4), Melvin Jackson (Disc One, track 6, Disc Two, tracks 3, 5 & 6), Rufus Reid (Disc One, tracks 1-5) - bass
Billy Higgins (Disc Two, tracks 2 & 4), Billy James (Disc One, tracks 1, 4 & 5),  Richard Smith (Disc One, track 6, Disc Two, tracks 3, 5 & 6) - drums
Leon "Ndugu" Chancler - drums, percussion (Disc One, tracks 1-3, Disc Two, track 1)
Ray Codrington (Disc Two, tracks 2 & 4), Frank Gordon (Disc One, tracks  1 & 3, Disc Two, track 1) - trumpet 
Billy Howell - trombone (Disc One, tracks  1 & 3, Disc Two, track 1)
Andre Fischer, Marshall Thompson - percussion (Disc One, track 4)
Vivian Harrell, Marilyn Haywood, Mary Ann Stewart - backing vocals (Disc One, track 4)

References 

Eddie Harris albums
1973 albums
Albums produced by Arif Mardin
Atlantic Records albums